Blessed Sacrament School is located in Wainwright, Alberta, Canada. BSS is a K-12 school that serves to about 700 students. It presently has a Junior Kindergarten available for ages 3–5, entitled Little Steps. The school team is the THUNDER. The school was originally established in 1933, but has been rebuilt by early 2004 due to fire on September 26, 2001.

External links
Blessed Sacrament School

Elementary schools in Alberta
High schools in Alberta
Educational institutions established in 1933
1933 establishments in Alberta